The  is the series of small sports cars produced by Nissan. Versions of the Silvia have been marketed as the 200SX or 240SX for export, with some export versions being sold under the Datsun brand.

The name "Silvia" is derived from Sylvia, the name of the nymph who served Diana, the Roman goddess of the hunt and chastity. The name also means "forest" in Latin.

CSP311 

In 1962, Albrecht Graf von Goertz has previously worked as a consultant for BMW, having created the BMW 507, and saw the potential of Japanese manufacturers. Yamaha had created the Technical Research Institute to develop their own sports car in 1959, and had built the YX30 sports car. As Yamaha had a working relationship with Nissan, work began on project A550X, but at some point the project fell apart and work was cancelled. Kazuo Kimura and Fumio Yoshida were both working on Project A550X and when the professional relationship between Nissan and Goertz ended in 1964, the work on the project contributed to the Silvia.

The Nissan Silvia CSP311 made its public debut at the Tokyo Motor Show in September 1964 as the "Datsun Coupe 1500". The introductory model was a hand-built coupe based on the Fairlady platform. The CSP311 was powered by the 96 hp 1.6 L Nissan R series engine. The engine was equipped with twin SU carburetors. Due to being nearly entirely hand made, only 554 were produced, mainly in 1965, before production stopped in 1968. Most of the vehicles remained in Japan; however, 49 examples were exported to Australia and another 10 went to other countries. 4 were also developed with a LHD interior for export to Europe for the purpose of display at events and shows.

In December 1965, Nissan provided the Tokyo Metropolitan Police Department with 2 CSP311 Silvia's for highway patrol use. These were modified from the production model to include standard police lights, sirens, police radio, overbumpers, as well as upgraded suspension to better cope with high speed patrol, however the engine remained standard. The CSP311 patrol car was the first Japanese high-performance patrol car, chosen due to being the fastest production car in Japan at the time with a top speed of 165 km/h (103 mph), and due to its disc brakes giving it good stopping power.

There was a convertible prototype CSP311 developed, however it was never produced.

S10 

The S10 was the first mass-produced Silvia built on the all-new S platform, intended as Nissan's compact, rear-wheel-drive, sporty car platform. Japanese versions were exclusive to Nissan Japanese dealerships called Nissan Prince Store along with the larger C110 Skyline. The S10 featured less "traditional" lines than similar offerings from rivals Toyota and Mazda sharing a common appearance with the larger Skyline. Initially, the S10 was intended to be powered by a rotary engine, however this idea was scrapped due to the oil crisis' of the 70's. The S10 Silvia and Datsun 200SX were based on the Datsun Sunny Coupe.

Japan 
In Japan, the S10, officially named "New Silvia" was initially fitted with a 1.8 L L18S inline-4 engine, which it shared with the Datsun 610/Bluebird 180B. The Japanese version featured Nissan NAPS emission control technology at its introduction. In 1976, the S10 received its first upgrade which included a new trim level "Type-LSE" which got a new L18E engine which had an electronic fuel injection intake instead of the carburetor. This upgrade also included a change to the model name, from S10 to S11. In 1977, the S11 received upgrades including interior upgrades, a body-colored front grille, new wheels, new hubcaps, new rubber bumper corners, a new trim level "Type-G" and more optional parts and colors.

North America 
The S10 was exported in 1976 to the North American market as the Datsun 200-SX, incorporating the larger-displacement 2.0 L L20B. This model in North America was affixed with the mandated  bumpers, a new fascia and a LHD interior. The Datsun-200SX was initially sold with an MSRP of US$4,399, equivalent to US$23,000 today, making it a relatively cheap car for the time. There are official photos of a trim level called the Datsun 200-SX/E which had window louvers, stripes, and a bodykit, however it appears to have never been produced.

Its success in both markets was limited, most buyers opting for the Celica over what was considered the more mundane S-Chassis. The car had a drivetrain similar to the popular 510, but with leaf springs fitted at the rear, rather than the 510's independent suspension. During the 4-year lifespan of the S10, over 145,000 units were produced until production stopped in 1979.

Even though it had poor handling, Paul Newman built and raced a 1977 Datsun 200SX in the 1978 IMSA Class C where it won 19 out of 22 races.

S110 

This iteration of the Silvia (sold in United States and Canada as the Datsun 200SX and in Mexico as the Datsun Sakura, Japanese for cherry blossom), available as a 2-door hardtop coupe and a new bodystyle 3-door hatchback. The Japanese market version of the hatchback was called the Gazelle and was exclusive to Nissan Bluebird Store locations sold alongside the Fairlady Z, while the coupe bodystyle Silvia remained exclusive to Nissan Prince Store locations alongside the Skyline. Its sharp-edged styling was shared with the new Nissan Leopard sedan and coupé, also exclusive to Nissan Bluebird Store.

Like the previous generation, the S110 Silvia was uniquely progressive in that it was originally intended to feature a rotary engine, designed and built by Nissan. The resulting unit was fairly unreliable, and forestalled production. Coincidentally, this Silvia shares its chassis code with the Mazda Cosmo, the first Japanese production car to feature a rotary engine. The chassis was shared with the B310 Nissan Sunny and the larger A10 Nissan Violet platform.

The car was redesigned shortly before it was released and the stillborn Wankel power plant was replaced by a line of twin-plug conventional piston engines from the new Z-series range. These included the Z20 and the turbocharged and later the fuel-injected Z18ET, although the latter of the two was only available to the Japanese domestic market and after the mid-life facelift. This took place in late May 1981 and included new bumpers and a reworked front design. Albeit a sporting design, the  Turbo model received largely the same chassis as regular models and did not have any kind of turbocharger boost indicator. At the time of the facelift, the DOHC FJ20-engined RS model was also introduced.

Gazelle 
Nissan rebadged the Silvia as the Gazelle coupé and hatchback so that Nissan's different dealership networks in Japan could all carry their own variants of the model. There are minor cosmetic differences between the two cars such as grille pattern and taillight lenses. Gazelle was treated as a more exclusive model, while the Silvia was the base and sporty models.

North America
The Silvia continued to be sold as the 200SX in North America, with either the two-door coupé or the three-door liftback bodywork. It was originally powered by the 2.0 L inline-four L20B engine, although in 1980 California-market cars received the twin-plug Z20 NAPS-Z inline-four of the same displacement. From the 1981 model year, this became the only engine available to the 200SX. For 1982 the 200SX was facelifted and gained the 2.2-liter Z22E engine coupled with the sturdier H190 rear axle. This model produces  SAE at 5200 rpm. There were no significant changes for 1983 and these were sold well into the 1984 model year, as the S12 did not appear until February 1984.

The top model was the luxurious SL, which received a remote opening hood, trunk, and gas tank lid, more adjustable seats, and a removable glass skyroof. The hatchback model received sportier trim, while the notchback coupé focused more on luxury.

240RS 
This generation saw the introduction of the Nissan 240RS (BS110), a coupe fitted with the 2.4-liter DOHC FJ24 engine. The 240RS was built between 1983 and 1985, its production extending the end of the S110 itself. The resulting machine became Nissan's official rally car in the World Rally Championship from 1983 to 1985, with its best result a second-place finish in the 1983 New Zealand Rally. This car was also featured in the video game Gran Turismo.

Chief Kogure's Gazelle 
As part of their sponsorship of the series, Nissan provided several of their vehicles for the production of the police drama Seibu Keisatsu, including a one-off S110 Gazelle convertible driven by Chief Kogure.

S12 

The S12 was produced from August 1983 to 1989, with revisions to the exterior trim in 1986 (referred to as "Mark II"). It used retractable pop-up headlights and was sold in two configurations — a coupé (often called a "notchback" due to the side profile view of its rear window section) and a hatchback version, which bore heavy resemblance to the liftback versions of the Toyota Corolla Levin and Sprinter Trueno AE86.

A number of different engines were equipped in the S12 chassis, depending on geographic market 
and production year, also a change in available engines again with the Mk2 revision. The NAPS system was carried over on the CA20E which replaced the Z engines of the S110 in North America. A CA18ET 1.8l turbo engine with ECCS was added for SE trims, Certain US trims had the S12 equipped with an optional VG30E V6 engine, also shared by the 300ZX (Z31). The FJ20 was replaced with the CA18DET in the Mk2 revision in markets where it was offered.

Japan 

As with the S110, the S12 chassis in Japan was badged as both a Silvia and a Gazelle. The S12 Silvia in Japan was available in a hatchback as a basic model only, or as a coupé (notchback) in base, RS, and RS-X trims and exclusive to Nissan Prince Store Japanese dealerships as a junior companion to the Nissan Skyline. The S12 Gazelle was strictly a hatchback, available in regular, RS and RS-X variants and exclusive to Nissan Bluebird Store locations as a junior companion to the Fairlady ZX. The RS was equipped with the 2.0-litre DOHC "FJ" engine (FJ20E), while the RS-X was equipped with a turbocharged version of the same engine (FJ20ET). In 1987 Nissan discontinued the FJ Series engine in the S12 and replaced it with the CA18DET (Also with dual cams but a bigger turbocharger — the CA18DET). Japanese spec Gazelle models came with many options like voice command, fog lights and a variety of different engine options (FJ20E, FJ20ET, CA18DE, CA18E, CA18DET.). The RS-X model also came with different factory alloy wheels. When the S13 Silvia was introduced in 1988 in Japan, the Gazelle nameplate was replaced with the Nissan 180SX as a junior companion to the 300ZX. In Australia there would not be a replacement until the introduction of the Silvia-based Nissan 200SX in 1995.

North America 

The S12 series was badged as a "Nissan 200SX" in North America. It was introduced in February 1984, four months behind the rest of Nissan's 1984 models. For fear that the North American market would not be as profitable as other markets throughout, Nissan executives only scheduled the manufacturing of 5,000 of each trim package/engine options in the final two years before the halt of production for the United States, which was in 1988.

The S12 "XE" notchback coupé, was only available with a 2.0-litre SOHC, non-turbo engine and made available with either a 5-speed manual or 4-speed automatic gearbox. (CA20E) The hatchback received both the 2.0L SOHC engine, and a 1.8L SOHC Turbo (non-intercooled) engine (CA18ET). This was similar to the engine offered in the non-turbo Z31 300ZX for that generation. This model received the RVS12 model code.

Europe 

The S12 chassis in Europe was badged as a "Silvia", with a notable exception of Sweden where it was sold as the "180ZX". "ZX" is traditionally associated with the Nissan Z-cars; the name change was done to avoid giving the car the same name as the Queen of Sweden. The ZX name was also used because Nissan's Swedish importer decided to stop carrying the Z31 300ZX when the naturally aspirated version was discontinued for Europe; the Silvia acted as a partial replacement for the Z-car in that region.

The European S12 was available only in the hatchback configuration, few were equipped with a rally package that included a rally foot brace for the navigator, headlamp guards, headlamp dust cleaners, with the same 1.8L SOHC Turbo (CA18ET) used in North America, and in some areas the 2.0L DOHC "FJ" engine (FJ20E). These models equipped with the rally package were dubbed "Rally Spec". The "FJ" engine series was originally designed for the "DR30" Nissan Skyline chassis, in both turbocharged and naturally aspirated versions. The CA18ET was also available catalyzed, producing .

Australia 

The S12 chassis in Australia, released in October 1983, was badged as a Gazelle. The Australian Gazelle was available in both hatchback and coupé variants. This engine was mated to either a five-speed manual gearbox or a four-speed automatic.

Trim levels comprised the GL hatchback (basic) and the luxury-oriented SGL coupé.

According to the May 1984 brochure, the coupé added: alloy wheels, mudflaps, electric windows/mirrors/antenna, a six speaker sound system (over four), time delay interior lighting, variable intermittent wipers, an armrest, carpet kickpads, and cloth headlining/sunvisors/door trims (over vinyl). An option pack for the coupé added air conditioning, power steering, and power sunroof. The hatchback's option pack added air conditioning, power steering, and power sunroof.

By the time of the August 1985 brochure, the coupé's option pack had been deleted, but the standard SGL coupé added power steering and a manual sunroof (a power sunroof was no longer offered). Air conditioning remained as an option, while power steering was added to the hatchback's option pack. The alloy wheel design was also changed.

The facelifted "Mark II" models were released to Australia in circa 1986.

Revisions 

The S12 chassis in 1984-86 is referred to as "Mark I", with "Mark II" as a revision in '87. Below lists the description of both.

Mark I 

The first trim of the S12 chassis. Bumpers featured matte-finish raised surfaces, and sides featured half-inch rubstripping. Cars featured a honeycomb radiator grille, and long corner lights. The RS-X trim in Japan and Europe received a hood bulge accent to accommodate the oversized dimensions of the FJ20E/ET engine, and featured a faux front vent with monogram (either FJ20, DOHC, or TURBO); In North America, the 1984 Turbo came with a "TURBO" monogrammed hood bulge accent, although all subsequent North American Mark I hoods were flat regardless of trim. In some markets, the 1984 and 1985 could be had with a foam rubber deck spoiler. In 1986 the foam rubber deck spoiler was changed for a fiberglass version with an integrated third brake light. Some hatchbacks and all Turbo models came with ground effects, as did the RS-X coupés These had a combination of plastic mudflaps (monogrammed as either "NISSAN", or "SILVIA" in applicable markets) and accommodating foam rubber sideskirts, as well as a foam rubber lower deflection lip. 1984 year foam rubber sideskirts featured the "NISSAN" monogram.

Mark II 

In 1986, the bumpers were updated, and the matte finished surfaces were eliminated for a more uniform surface. Rubstripping was increased to 2-inch height w/ scribe detailing. The honeycomb radiator grille was replaced with a slatted version that spanned the entire front end (previous was shorter), and cornerlights were shortened. The "SE" model and the Turbo (Canada, Europe) came with new fiberglass ground effects and mudflaps, painted in the color of the car, and a new and more pronounced lower deflection lip in the front. All Mark II S12's received a new reverse-cowl hood bulge design to accommodate clearance for the new 3.0-litre V6. Optional rear mudflap accents were available.

Drivetrain rear-wheel-drive

Engine

Special Editions 

In Europe, a limited-run (~250 units?) version of the S12 was produced and sold as the "Silvia Grand Prix" model. Based on a Mark I chassis, it was powered by the FJ20E (with a few known to be sold with the CA18DET), and featured molded-in fiberglass wide body fenders and quarter sections and special edition wheels.

The widebody exterior grabs design cues from popular European rally car platforms of the time (e.g. Audi Quattro, BMW M3 Sport Evolution, Renault 5 Turbo 2, etc.), although Nissan's choice of the FJ20E over the FJ20ET suggests this was more of a "rally inspired" car rather than a serious performance trim. The Silvia Grand Prix holds the distinction as one of the rarest incarnation of the S12, along with the CA18DET-engined RS-X in Japan, and are generally considered to be collector's items.

In Japan, a special anniversary model was produced and sold as the "50th Anniversary Version" with the CA18DET. Between 100 and 300 units were sold. It came with a white and gold two tone decals and interior, gold wheels, an electronic instrument cluster and navigation system, a voice warning system, gold badges and gold keys.

Motorsports 

The elimination of Group B from the World Rally Championship signified the end of Nissan's FJ24-powered 240RS. The FJ20ET-powered Silvia RS-X of 1986 would have been Nissan's first choice, however there was an insufficient number of that exact trim sold in Japan to meet the WRC's Homologation requirements (minimum 5000 units). Nissan had to quickly find a car to replace the 240RS.

The North American 1987 200SX SE V6 was chosen and competed in 1986-89 as a 200SX. Nissan's creation and choice of this car ensured they could sell 5000 cars required for WRC Homologation. The S12 "SE" trim's V6 held the only real appeal to the North American market, allowing Nissan to sell right at 5000 cars to a single specification. The V6 was a very unusual choice as the WRC was dominated by 4-cylinder 2.0 L turbocharged engines, although for similar reasons Toyota entered WRC with the 6-cylinder Supra at the same time. The 200SX achieved a first place in the 1988 Ivory coast rally and second place for two years running in the very challenging Safari Rally 1988 and Safari Rally 1989.

Mark Skaife won the 1987 Australian 2.0 Litre Touring Car Championship driving a Nissan Gazelle entered by the Nissan Motor Company.

Motorsports in Japan 

The Silvia S12 competed in the JSS (Japan Supersports Series) throughout the 1980s, when many of the top tuners got their start. They featured 15"x10"J wheels under the "Fisco" wide body kit. The JSS S12's made between 280PS to 340PS from the FJ20ET and CA18DET from 1987. The "HKS World Trade Silvia" sponsored and engineered by tuners HKS and Tomei ran in this series.

S13 

The S13 Silvia was introduced in mid-1988 and was immensely popular in Japan. Upon its introduction, it won the 1988 Car of the Year Japan Award. The Silvia was no longer exported, however; rebadged 180SXs were instead sold in most markets. European versions of this car were still known as the 200SX. In North America, the S13 (with the 180SX front in all three different body-styles) was known as the 240SX. The 200SX nameplate was on hiatus in that region but would return on a 2-door coupé version of the B14 Nissan Sunny/Sentra (1995–99), itself based on the Japan-only 2-door Nissan Lucino. Following industry trends, the S13 Silvia switched to relampable fixed headlights. Projector optics were offered as an option.

In Japan, Nissan renamed the Gazelle as the Nissan 180SX, which was exported to North America primarily under the name Nissan 240SX. The 180SX served as the junior companion to the Fairlady ZX at Nissan Bluebird Store Japanese dealerships. As before, the Silvia was exclusive to Japanese dealerships called Nissan Prince Store next to the Skyline.

The S13 Silvia coupé was made from 1988 to 1994, overlapping with the S14 Silvia introduced in 1993. The Nissan Silvia used fixed headlights; whereas the 180SX, simply a hatchback version of the Silvia, introduced at the same time used pop-up headlights. The hatchback version, called the 180SX, replaced the Gazelle name in Japan and remained in production until 1998.

The S13 was one of the first uses of Nissan's multi-link rear suspension, the technology of which was previewed in concept cars in previous years, such as the Nissan MID4. It also offered a four-wheel steering system for the first time, known as HICAS-II. In 1990, HICAS-II was updated and renamed SuperHICAS. The S13 also saw the introduction of a viscous-type limited slip differential for some models.

S13 Silvias were initially powered by the CA18DE and CA18DET engines carried over from the end of S12 production, with an intercooler added to the CA18DET for a slight increase in stability and power. In mid-1990, (for the 1991 model year) the SR20DE and SR20DET engines debuted, offering improvements across the board in power and torque due to increased displacement and a more efficient turbocharger than was offered on the previous cars. One of the other simple changes that were made between the CA generation and the SR generation was the switch to a single colour paint job, instead of the two-tone colour sets that were previously offered. On top of this, the SR motor later debuted another variant of the platform known simply as the "blacktop". Identifiable by its black and silver rocker-cover (as opposed to the traditional red/silver cover), it featured a number of minor changes, resulting in a little performance gain. It is vastly different from the more powerful "notch top" used in the S14 and S15 variants.

In the U.S. the S13 was replaced after the 1994 model year by the new S14 design but lived on until 1998 in Japan with a major facelift, the 180SX Aero (Type X). This was known as the "Kouki" generation, while the previous (or 'middle') generation was referred to as "Chuki". The Kouki models featured newly designed tail-lights, a redesigned aero body kit and outfitted with an airbag.

In 1998, the S13 Silvia was resurrected, in part, with a variant produced by Kid's Heart for Nissan called the Sileighty, which featured the 180SX body with the front end of the Silvia. The Sileighty was originally created by Japanese enthusiasts for their own 180SXs, and is still a common modification for both the 180SX and 240SX fastback. The Sileighty made an appearance in the Initial D Japanese anime and manga series (based around the Japanese motorsports of touge and drifting), which featured the Sileighty in one of the first battles in the manga and one of the last battles in First Stage (the first season of the anime).

The creation of the Sileighty was then followed by another version of the Silvia known as the Onevia. Based on the chassis of the S13, the front end of the Silvia would be removed and replaced with the front end of a 180SX. The Onevia was never retailed as a complete car in Japan (though it was in North America: the coupé version of the 240SX was essentially a left hand drive version of the Silvia with the 180SX/240SX nose).

The Mitsuoka Le-Seyde was a retro-styled car (á la the Zimmer Golden Spirit) based on the S13 Silvia, built in a very limited series in 1990. It used the S13 Silvia's centre portion, engine, and underpinnings.

Convertible 

A Silvia convertible was briefly offered soon after the start of production and sold in limited numbers. Demand was low at the time due to high cost (3.25 million Yen in 1988), heavier curb weight, and chassis flex. The Silvia convertibles were a conversion done by Autech Japan, Inc. and the production was entrusted to Takada Kogyo with a manufacture date of July 1988. A total of 603 Autech convertibles were produced in the following colour codes: TH1 - velvet blue (430), 5G7 - green two-tone lime (50), 5H6 - warm two-tone white (70),  AH3 - cranberry red (40), and DH0 dark green (10). The other three were made to order for Nissan and the colours are unknown. They came equipped with K's trim grade, which included the turbocharged CA18DET engine. All of the 600 publicly available cars were sold with a 4-speed automatic transmission.

It was unrelated to the 240SX convertible offered in North America in 1992, which was a local conversion done by ASC.

Trim level designations 

The S13 Silvia was the first S-series car to use the J's, Q's, and K's designations for the different trim packages. These names are references to the face cards of English playing cards.

The J's was the base model. The Q's model offered a slightly more refined experience and received electric options and an available LSD. The K's grade received the turbocharged CA18DET or SR20DET (depending on the year of manufacture) in addition to the options offered on the Q's.

On top of the K's and Q's models, the Club and Diamond Selection packages came with specific options bundled together. For example, all K's Club Selections came with projector headlamps, a rear spoiler, and 15" aluminum wheels while all Q's models came out with automatic climate control.

The A's "Almighty" trim was introduced in early 1991, and had a limited manufacturing run of fewer than 150. Trim-wise, the Almighty slotted between the J's and Q's trim grades, offering options not available on the J's but also not including all the standard features of the Q's (power windows and sunroof). The only available powertrain was the naturally aspirated SR20DE with a five-speed manual transmission. What sets the Almighty apart from other trim levels is its body style: it had a new front-end that featured pop-up headlights in place of the fixed headlights of the Silvia, similar to the unofficial Onevia and the North American 240SX coupé.

There were a number of different headlight options over the years, including triple projectors, dual projectors and square projectors (usually referred to as "bricks").

S14 

The S14 Silvia debuted in Japan towards the end of 1993. It was lower and wider than the S13. New rounded styling contributed to the illusion of a greater increase in size than actually occurred. Wheelbase and track were both increased, leading to slightly improved handling. Unlike export markets, where sales of the S14 chassis variants faltered, the Silvia remained popular in Japan. However, the width dimension exceeded , which pushed this generation out of the compact class tax bracket and made Japanese buyers liable for higher road taxes. Sales of the S14 also faltered because specialty car buyers at the time were moving to RVs and SUVs. The fastback and convertible bodystyles were discontinued internationally, leaving only the coupé in production.

Trim level designations were similar to the S13, however the Club Selection package was dropped. "Aero" variants of the Q's and K's were offered that featured large rear wings and mild ground effects.

The S14 Silvia K's received a new version of the SR20DET, with a slight bump in power due to the implementation of Nissan's variable cam timing system known as N-VCT, on the intake cam, and a larger T28 turbocharger.

There was a mild styling update to the S14 during 1996, which added aggressive-looking projector headlamps and tinted taillights to all models. The older version is known as the zenki (前期, literally "prior period"). Fascias and other exterior trim pieces were also revised. The turbocharger now used a more efficient ball bearing center section. This updated version is also known as the kouki (後期, literally "later period") S14, or by enthusiasts as the S14A. It was sold as the second generation 240SX in North America from 1995 to 1998, equipped with the non-turbo KA24DE engine. The final model year of S14 production in all markets was 1999, called the Touring Model, which had a better engine block, pistons, and better acceleration in lower gears.

Nismo 270R 

The 270R was a limited edition vehicle developed by Nissan Motorsports, produced only in 1994. The vehicle was built on the S14 chassis but had many enhancements over the Silvia. The '270' is in reference to the horsepower of the unique car as opposed to the displacement of the engine. The 270R featured a vented hood with a front-mounted intercooler, Nismo 'Edge' Aero kit, heavy duty clutch, 2-way limited slip differential, NISMO logo front and rear seats among other upgrades. All the 270s were painted Black with 'Nismo 270R' badging above the rear wheels and a product numbered plaque in the glove compartment. Only 30 270Rs were ever built.

Autech Version K's MF-T 

Tuning company Autech, has a tuned adaption of the CS14 King's variant. This includes Aero style HUD with white displays and gauges for oil pressure, boost, and voltage in the centre console, along with a MOMO steering wheel and leather gear knob. The interior trim is also revised.

Handling improvements include multi-link suspension, firmer shocks and springs, front strut brace, and a rear sway bar. A large F40 style rear spoiler and aero bodykit with Autech indicators are also fitted. An "Autech Version K's MF-T" badge and sticker can be found on the boot.

An IHI ball bearing turbo (VN14) was fitted in favour of the Garrett T28 for slightly quicker response and flow. Larger 480 cc injectors found in the later S15 Spec R's were also fitted as well as a thicker 80 mm intercooler also found in S15's. To help expel exhaust, a higher flowing Fujitsubo Giken (FGK) exhaust was fitted.

The engine is an Autech-tuned SR20DET that produces 182kW (245hp/250PS).

According to the Autech website, the vehicle is still available at a cost of ¥2.99 million yen (around 27,000 US dollars).

S15 

The non-turbo SR20DE produced .

The S15 Silvia included aggressive styling inside and out, updating the previous Silvia styling in-line with modern car design trends. The body dimensions were reduced from the previous generation so that it would comply with Japanese Government compact class, which had an effect on sales of the previous model.

The S15 Silvia model lineup was initially simplified to just Spec-S and Spec-R, with both models offering an "Aero" variant with a large rear wing, side skirts, valances and front bumper.

This generation of the Silvia was only sold new in Japan, Australia and New Zealand. In Australia and New Zealand the car was sold as the Nissan 200SX.

As of August 2002, Nissan stopped producing the S platform with the S15-series Nissan Silvia being the final variant. Production of the Silvia ended amidst Nissan's efforts to reduce its myriad of platforms. The S15 Silvia was therefore the last car to use the Silvia name, as well as the last  sports car with a true FR layout offered by Nissan. Nissan's current worldwide sports car platform is the front midship FM platform, which underpins the Z33/34 Fairlady Z (the 350/370Z outside Japan) sports car and the V35/37 Nissan Skyline (the Infiniti G35/37 in North America) luxury-sport sedan and coupé.

Variants

Spec-R 

The Spec-R was fitted with a turbocharged SR20DET engine, and differed from previous Silvia models by featuring a 6-speed manual gearbox as well as a 4-speed automatic transmission. The Spec-R also included extensive chassis and suspension strengthening via the use of larger anti-roll bars and strut bracing. The S15 featured the same 4-piston front brake calipers that were found in the Z32 300ZX but included a larger brake booster.

One of the biggest changes to the S15 model of the Silvia fitted with the 6-speed manual transmission built by Aisin Seiki was the implementation of a helical limited-slip differential. The result was a safer, more track suited drive; in some contrast to its drifting heritage and subsequent media attention. All other versions of the Silvia (S14, S15 Spec S JDM) came with the viscous limited slip differential.

HICAS (High Capacity Active Steering) four-wheel steering was available as an option.

Spec-S 

The Spec-S was fitted with a naturally aspirated SR20DE engine, and featured a 5-speed manual transmission (in addition to a 4-speed automatic available on both the Spec-S and the Spec-R). It lacked the additional chassis support of the Spec-R; featured 4-piston front brake caliper and a slightly smaller brake booster. The Spec-S came only with an open differential with an optional LSD. Australian-delivered Spec-S models featured the same helical differential, chassis bracing and 6 speed manual transmission as the Australian market Spec-R models.

The S15 line was later expanded to include various luxury and upgrade option packages for both the Spec-S and Spec-R. Autech, a specialty car developer, also offered several tuned versions of the S15; one with body and interior trim modeled after the Ferrari 456, called the style-A, available in both Spec-S and Spec-R based trims; and a second tuned version was based on the Spec-S trim level with the engine output increased to  through the use of increased compression, more aggressive camshafts, and free-breathing intake and exhaust tracts, along with ECU tuning and upgrades to the chassis and suspension. This version also included the 6-speed transmission and other upgrades normally found only in the Spec-R.

Silvia Varietta

In Japan, Nissan offered a retractable hardtop variant of the Silvia, called the Varietta. The Varietta was built by Autech and was based on the Spec-S model, featuring the same naturally aspirated engine, with a choice of the 5-speed manual transmission or the 4-speed automatic transmission. This is a rare type of Nissan Silvia which is uncommon in most places as only 1143 cars were produced.

New Le-Seyde

Mitsuoka produced an updated version of their Mitsuoka Le-Seyde (also known as the New Le-Seyde) based on the S15 Silvia, built in limited quantities in 2000. As with the original Le-Seyde, it used the S15 Silvia's centre portion, engine, and underpinnings.

Australian and New Zealand versions 

The Australian and New Zealand versions of the Silvia S15 were sold as the Nissan 200SX, with the two regions having differences between each other. These models were never officially sold with the option of a naturally aspirated SR20DE in those regions, especially with the Australian-spec Spec-S model.

Australian version 

The Australian market received the S15 Silvia in October 2000. Unlike the New Zealand-spec S15, the car was built to different specs from the factory, featuring a 17-digit VIN instead of the Japanese "S15-XXXXXX" one. It was offered in the Spec-R and Spec-S trims, all with the SR20DET engine. The main difference between the two being that the Spec-R was offered from the factory with a sunroof. The engine was de-tuned to meet Australian fuel regulations; power outputs decreased from 247 bhp to 197 bhp. The car also received various other changes from Japanese models to lower costs, some of which being the removal of the rear window wiper, sun-visor mirrors, A-pillar boost gauge, auto-climate control, and electric folding mirrors. The steering wheel was changed to the one found in the R34 Nissan Skyline 25GT Turbo (GT-T), however the Australian market did receive a 260 km/h speedometer instead of the 180 km/h speedometer in the Japanese version.

Available at the end of 200SX production for Australia was the "GT" edition, available on both the Spec-S and Spec-R. This featured the "L Package" interior and the "Aero" Wing of the Japanese models. All GTs received darker colour wheels and GT badges taken from the Nissan Skyline GT-R located on the fenders. Additionally, chrome interior door handles, chrome gear selector surround, "sports" metal pedal sets were standard on the GT.

In total, 3,879 Australian 200SXs were produced, making up just over 10 percent of S15 production.

New Zealand version 

The New Zealand market received the S15 Silvia in May 1999. These were official models, unlike with the Australian S15 Silvia, which were released a year later. They came offered with the SR20DET engine. The New Zealand S15s were Japan-spec from the factory and modified by New Zealand vehicle dealerships to meet New Zealand road requirements. These modifications included an antenna on the rear right quarter panel, an optional 2-spoke spoiler, New Zealand-spec brochures, and 200SX badges (which are located on the rear bumper instead of the boot lid). To comply with New Zealand's road regulations, the New Zealand S15s had a "JN1" VIN on a metal plaque placed over the JDM VIN on the firewall.

In total, 477 200SXs were sold in New Zealand from July 1997 to August 2002, which included S14 models. This does not include the few 40+ S15s from May 1999 to July 1999, as they weren't included in the official Nissan databases. The reasons for these exclusions are unknown.

Motorsports 

The S-chassis is a popular drift car and time attack car, especially the S13 through S15 vehicles. This is due to the extreme versatility and huge aftermarket for the S-chassis; many professional racing cars have been built with off-the-shelf suspension and engine components. The car has enjoyed success, having won 11 D1 Grand Prix championships with 8 different drivers driving the S15 (Nobuteru Taniguchi : 2001; Ryuji Miki : 2004; Yasuyuki Kazama : 2005; Masato Kawabata : 2007; Youichi Imamura: 2009, 2010, 2011; Masashi Yokoi: 2018, 2019; Masanori Kohashi: 2020; Naoki Nakamura: 2021). Odi Bakchis, a pro-level drifter from USA who started drifting in 2011, has an S14 that races in Formula Drift, finishing third in the Formula Drift USA Championship. He has multiple event wins and has placed in the Top 5 overall in Formula Drift for the past 4 years. In 2017,2018 and 2019 Formula Drift driver James Deane campaigned and won the PRO championship in the Worthouse Drift Team S15.

In Europe, the S13 has also been very popular with pro-level drifters, especially in countries like the United Kingdom, Poland, France, Germany, Sweden, Norway, Russia and Ukraine. While some have opted to keep the SR20DET engine, most drivers swap this for the more powerful RB25DET unit, or even the Toyota Supra derived 2JZ, like Pawel Trela from Poland.

Silvias have been raced successfully in the All-Japan Grand Touring Car Championship (now Super GT) and its predecessors. Both the S14 and S15 generations of the Silvia won the GT300 class championship in 1997 and 2001 respectively. In the late Eighties, when Group B was banned, S110 and S12 Silvias also saw limited success in rallying, mainly on endurance rallies. During the S13's production, there was a one-make series in Japan. The S13s were also successful in racing in the IMSA GTU class during the 1990s.

The Silvia S15 of Under Suzuki has dominated the Tsukuba circuit lap time record for some time. After it defeated the HKS CT230R LanEvo for the record in 2012, Under Suzuki's S15 has been resetting Tsukuba's lap time record. The latest lap record is currently timed at 50.366s, even faster than an official JGTC race car ARTA NSX.

References

External links

SilviaOC.com - Official Silvia Owners Club (International) - Forums, Guides, Technical Support, Events, Downloads, Classified Adverts and more
S12Silvia.com - Blog, Forum, and Tech for the International S12 Community
200SX.gr  Hellas 200sx Club
SXOC UK 200sx owners club
Nissan Silvia S15—Archive of Nissan's official site for the S15 Silvia. 
Club-S12.org - International Nissan Silvia/Gazelle/200SX S12 Site - International Nissan S12 Chassis specific site.
Nissan Silvia —Australian Nissan Silvia Club.
SilviaWA - Nissan Silvia Car Club of Western Australia
Zilvia - S chassis and Z chassis owners
Ultimate Nissan Silvia S15 Guide - S15 model information, specifications, motorsport history and common performance upgrades
History of the Silvia Autospeed Magazine (note: some technical inaccuracies and minor nomenclature errors)
Paper scale model of the Nissan Silvia. To download, print and build yourself.
http://gtr-registry.com/en-s15-silvia-200sx.php#S15ColoursBreakdown

Silvia
Rear-wheel-drive vehicles
Vehicles with four-wheel steering
Rally cars
Sports cars
Sport compact cars
Coupés
Hardtop convertibles
1970s cars
1980s cars
1990s cars
2000s cars
Cars introduced in 1964
Group B cars